The Hong Kong Journal of Social Work is a bilingual academic journal published by the Hong Kong Social Workers Association Limited in collaboration with World Scientific in English and Chinese. It emphasizes articles related to the field of social work, written in the local context.

Abstracting and indexing 
The journal is indexed by Sociological Abstracts and the International Bibliography of the Social Sciences.

World Scientific academic journals
Publications established in 1967
Multilingual journals
Sociology journals